Lengnau may refer to one of the following municipalities in Switzerland:

Lengnau, Aargau, in the Canton of Aargau
Lengnau, Bern, in the Canton of Bern